Women & Songs 10 is the special tenth anniversary edition in the Women & Songs franchise.

Overview
Released on October 31, 2006, the album's subtitle was simply "The 10th Anniversary Collection".  19 tracks pack the disc, including Rihanna continuing to submit songs to the collection with her latest contribution, Unfaithful.  Country group The Wreckers make their Women & Songs debut with Leave the Pieces alongside Faith Hill and LeAnn Rimes, each with their own hits.  The Pussycat Dolls also appear with Don't Cha.  A nice finish to the album is a live version of Sarah Slean's Lucky Me.

Track listing
 Leave the Pieces (Billy Austin/Jennifer Hanson) [3:30]
(performed by The Wreckers)
 Suddenly I See (KT Tunstall) [3:20]
(performed by KT Tunstall)
 Sunshine and Summertime (Rodney Clawson/John Rich/Kylie Sackley) [3:27]
(performed by Faith Hill)
 Probably Wouldn't Be This Way (John Kennedy/Tammi Kidd) [3:37]
(performed by LeAnn Rimes)
 Always on Your Side (Sheryl Crow) [4:14]
(performed by Sheryl Crow)
 What You Gonna Do (Doyle Bramhall) [3:53]
(performed by Sass Jordan)
 Unfaithful (M. Eriksen/T. Hermansen/S. Smith) [3:47]
(performed by Rihanna)
 Me & U (Ryan Leslie) [3:13]
(performed by Cassie)
 Don't Cha (Thomas Callaway/Anthony Ray) [4:03]
(performed by The Pussycat Dolls)
 Twist My Hair (M. Brown/Noah Shebib) [4:13]
(performed by Divine Brown)
 Put Your Records On (John Beck/Steve Chrisanthou/Corinne Bailey Rae) [3:34]
(performed by Corinne Bailey Rae)
 Good Day (Kara DioGuardi/Jewel Kilcher/Greg Wells) [3:45]
(performed by Jewel)
 Where Will We Be Tomorrow (John Sinclair/Leslie Stanwyck) [3:49]
(performed by Leslie Stanwyck)
 Mushaboom (Leslie Feist) [3:44]
(performed by Feist)
 Oleander (Sarah Harmer) [3:27]
(performed by Sarah Harmer)
 Waiting Song (Theresa Sokyrka) [3:14]
(performed by Theresa Sokyrka)
 Skinny Boy (Amy Millan) [3:28]
(performed by Amy Millan)
 Just Another Day (Serena Ryder) [3:14]
(performed by Serena Ryder)
 Lucky Me - Live Version (Sarah Slean) [3:41]
(performed by Sarah Slean)

References
 [ Women & Songs 10 at AllMusic]

2006 compilation albums